In Greek mythology, Cephisso, Cephiso,  or Kephiso (Ancient Greek: Κηφισώ) was one of the three Muses that were daughters of Apollo. Her sisters were Apollonis and Borysthenis.

Notes 

Children of Apollo
Greek Muses